José Quiroga Suárez (4 July 1920 in Petín, Galicia − 18 October 2006 in A Rúa, Galicia) was a Spanish politician and the second president of the pre-autonomic community of Galicia before reaching its Statute of Autonomy in 1981.

References

Presidents of the Regional Government of Galicia
1920 births
2006 deaths
Members of the 1st Parliament of Galicia
People from the Province of Ourense